Maes-e is a popular Welsh-language internet forum created on 18 August 2002 by Nic Dafis. The site has over 3,000 registered members and is considered an important contribution to the development of the online Welsh-speaking community and the use of the language in cyberspace.

The website allows members to discuss all manner of subjects, and contains subforums on a variety of topics, such as music, computers, cinema, the Welsh language, politics and so on. It has also become a place for the Welsh-language music scene's artists to release information concerning concert dates and new material, but perhaps more importantly in terms of internet use it has proven to be an important place for those wishing to develop Welsh language software and language packs (such as those for Firefox and Windows) to exchange ideas, advice and technical information.

Nic Dafis retired as administrator of the website on 31 December 2007, handing over control to Hedd Gwynfor, a grandchild of Gwynfor Evans.

The site is named after a track of the same name from an album called Libertino by Datblygu.

References

External links
 maes-e

Welsh language
Welsh-language mass media
Internet forums